The army cutworm is the immature form of Euxoa auxiliaris. The adult moth is called a "miller moth" because of the fine scales on its wings that rub off easily and remind people of the dusty flour that covers the clothing of a miller.

These native North American larvae consume emerging small grains, alfalfa, and canola in the southern Great Plains and southern Canada. Larvae feed above ground at night and usually hide in soil during daylight, but will also feed on cloudy days.

On dry, low elevation rangelands of the U.S. Intermountain West, army cutworms consume exotic cheatgrass (Bromus tectorum) and mustards to produce cheatgrass "die-offs." Within these bare areas, the larvae also  defoliate native shrubs including four-wing saltbush (Atriplex canescens) and sagebrush (Artemisia spp.).

The miller moth is a seasonal nuisance in the spring in states including Colorado, Wyoming, New Mexico and Kansas, as they hatch in the low-lying farmlands, then migrate to higher elevations for the summer.  They return as the weather cools but in smaller numbers.  They are considered nearly impossible to control through normal pest extermination techniques because a new batch shows up every day as they migrate.  With their very small bodies, they enter homes (attracted by the light) in the evening through any available crack or crevice (doorjamb, chimney, etc.) and residents in migration paths report dozens of moths per day entering their homes and garages.  However, other than being a nuisance, they are not considered harmful.

Location
Euxoa auxiliaris is commonly found in the Western section and prairies of the United States. They are known to travel to alpine climate regions in late June and early July where they feed at night on the nectar of wildflowers. Army cutworms are one of the richest foods for predators, such as brown bears, in this ecosystem, where up to 72 per cent of the moth's body weight is fat, thus making it more calorie-rich than elk or deer. This is the highest known body fat percentage of any animal.

References

Euxoa
Agricultural pest insects
Moths of North America
Moths described in 1873